Christophe Van Rossom (born April 21, 1969) is a speaker, author of numerous articles and studies, Belgian poet and essayist. He teaches at the Royal Conservatory of Brussels, School of Graphic Research and in the Université libre de Bruxelles.

Works

 Mallarmé, facile ?, Éditions Renaissance du Livre, Collection Paroles d'Aube, 2002 
 À Voix haute, Éditions de l'Ambedui, Bruxelles, juin 2002 
 Jacques Crickillon : La vision et le souffle, Éditions Luce Wilquin, Collection L'œuvre en lumière, 2003 
 Pour saluer le Comte de La Fère : (La leçon d'Athos), Éditions William Blake And Co, 2004 
 Sous un ciel dévoyé, Éditions Cormier, 2005 
 Marcel Moreau : L'insoumission et l'ivresse, Éditions William Blake And Co, 2005 
 Jacques Cels, architecte du sens, Éditions Luce Wilquin, Collection L'œuvre en lumière, 2009 
 Savoir de guerre, Éditions William Blake And Co, 2009 
 Petit traité d'athéologie, Éditions Le Cadran ligné, 2010
 Le Rire de Démocrite, Éditions la Lettre volée, 2012,

References

1969 births
Living people
Writers from Brussels
Belgian poets in French
Belgian writers in French
Academic staff of the Université libre de Bruxelles
Academic staff of the Royal Conservatory of Brussels
Belgian literary critics